{{DISPLAYTITLE:Ξcc++}}{{PAGENAME:Ξcc++}}

Its discovery by the LHCb Collaboration was announced on 6 July 2017 in Venice, Italy, at the European Physical Society Conference on High Energy Physics.  is the first baryon discovered with two heavy quarks (charm and/or bottom) and a light quark. Its mass is 3621 MeV, nearly four times that of the proton.

It was identified when it disintegrated into a  baryon and three lighter mesons, K, π and π.

See also 

 List of baryons

References

Bibliography 
 
 
 

Baryons